Antonia Churchill-Lance (May 6, 1919 – January 19, 2016) was an American sailor who competed at the 1936 Summer Olympics in Berlin. In the 8 metre event, she finished tenth and last as a member of the American team led by her father, 1932 gold medalist Owen Churchill. Born in Los Angeles, California, she was a member of the Los Angeles Yacht Club, and attended UCLA.

References

External links

1919 births
2016 deaths
American female sailors (sport)
Los Angeles Yacht Club sailors
Olympic sailors of the United States
Sailors at the 1936 Summer Olympics – 8 Metre
Sportspeople from Los Angeles
University of California, Los Angeles alumni
21st-century American women